Frank Martinus Arion (born Frank Efraim Martinus; 17 December 1936 – 28 September 2015) was a Curaçaoan poet, novelist, and language advocate.

He moved to the Netherlands in 1955 and in 1981 returned to Curaçao, where he became head of the Curaçao Language Institute that promotes the use of the Papiamentu language. His works include The Last Freedom (De laatste vrijheid) and Double Play (Dubbelspel). The latter novel is considered to be his magnum opus and was published in 1973. He wrote in Papiamentu and Dutch.

Bibliography
 1957 - Stemmen uit Afrika (gedichten)
 1972 - Bibliografie van het Papiamentu
 1973 - Dubbelspel - awarded the Van der Hoogt Prize [English translation: Double Play, translated from Dutch by Paul Vincent; London]
 1974 - Sisyphiliaans alpinisme tegen miten
 1975 - Afscheid van de koningin
 1977 - Albert Helman, de eenzame jager
 1979 - Nobele wilden
 1993 - De ibismensmuis
 1995 - De laatste vrijheid
 1996 - The Kiss of a Slave
 2001 - De eeuwige hond
 2005 - Eén ding is droevig
 2006 - De deserteurs
 2006 - Drie romans

Adaptations

Arion's 1973 Dutch-language novel Double Play was adapted into the 2017 English-language film Double Play, directed by Ernest R. Dickerson.

References

External links

Foundation for the Production and Translation of Dutch Literature website on Arion

1936 births
2015 deaths
Curaçao poets
Curaçao novelists
Papiamento-language writers
Papiamento-speaking people
20th-century poets
20th-century novelists
21st-century poets
21st-century novelists
Male poets
Male novelists
20th-century Dutch male writers
21st-century Dutch male writers